Sainte-Catherine (also unofficially: Sainte-Catherine-lès-Arras, literally Sainte-Catherine near Arras) is a commune in the Pas-de-Calais department in the Hauts-de-France region of France.

Geography

Population

Notable people 
Mathieu Assou-Ekotto (born 1978), former footballer
Nando de Colo (born 1987), basketball player

Places of interest
 The church of St.Catherine, rebuilt, along with much of the commune, after World War I.

See also
Communes of the Pas-de-Calais department

References

External links

 Official website of Sainte-Catherine 

Saintecatherine
County of Artois